This is a list of the sporting events that took place at the 2007 Panamerican Games, held in Rio de Janeiro, from July 13–29, 2007.

Archery

Men's
Individual competition
Team competition

Women's
Individual competition
Team competition

Aquatics

Diving

Men's
3 m Springboard
10 m Platform
3 m Synchronized Springboard
10 m Synchronized Platform

Women's
3 m Springboard
10 m Platform
3 m Synchronized Springboard
10 m Synchronized Platform

Open water swimming

Men's
10 km

Women's
10 km

Swimming

Men's
50 m Freestyle
100 m Freestyle
200 m Freestyle
400 m Freestyle
1,500 m Freestyle
100 m Backstroke
200 m Backstroke
100 m Breaststroke
200 m Breaststroke
100 m Butterfly
200 m Butterfly
200 m Individual Medley
400 m Individual Medley
4 × 100 m Freestyle Relay
4 × 200 m Freestyle Relay
4 × 100 m Medley Relay

Women's
50 m Freestyle
100 m Freestyle
200 m Freestyle
400 m Freestyle
800 m Freestyle
100 m Backstroke
200 m Backstroke
100 m Breaststroke
200 m Breaststroke
100 m Butterfly
200 m Butterfly
200 m Individual Medley
400 m Individual Medley
4 × 100 m Freestyle Relay
4 × 200 m Freestyle Relay
4 × 100 m Medley Relay

Synchronized swimming

Women's
Duet
Team

Water polo

Men's
8-Team Event

Women's
6-Team Event

Athletics

Men's
100 m
200 m
400 m
800 m
1,500 m
5,000 m
10,000 m
110 m hurdles
400 m hurdles
3,000 m Steeplechase
Marathon
20 km Walk
50 km Walk
4 × 100 m Relay
4 × 400 m Relay
Long jump
Triple jump
High jump
Pole vault
Shot put
Discus throw
Javelin throw
Hammer throw
Decathlon

Women's
100 m
200 m
400 m
800 m
1,500 m
5,000 m
10,000 m
110 m hurdles
400 m hurdles
3,000 m Steeplechase
Marathon
20 km Walk
4 × 100 m Relay
4 × 400 m Relay
Long jump
Triple jump
High jump
Pole vault
Shot put
Discus throw
Javelin throw
Hammer throw
Heptathlon

Badminton

Men's
Individual Event
Doubles Event

Women's
Individual Event
Doubles Event

Mixed
Mixed Doubles Event

Baseball

Men's
8-Team Event

Basketball

Men's
8-Team Event

Women's
8-Team Event

Beach volleyball

Men's
Men's Competition

Women's
Women's Competition

Bowling

Men's
Individual Event
Doubles Event

Women's
Individual Event
Doubles Event

Boxing

Men's
Light flyweight (-48 kg)
Flyweight (48–51 kg)
Bantamweight (51–54 kg)
Featherweight (54–57 kg)
Lightweight (57–60 kg)
Light welterweight (60–64 kg)
Welterweight (64–69 kg)
Middleweight (69–75 kg)
Light heavyweight (75–81 kg)
Heavyweight (81–91 kg)
Super heavyweight (+91 kg)

Canoe racing

Men's
K-1 500 m
K-2 500m
K-1 1,000 m
K-2 1,000 m
K-4 1,000 m
C-1 500m
C-2 500 m
C-1 1,000 m
C-2 1,000 m

Women's
K-1 500 m
K-2 500m
K-4 500 m

Cycling

BMX

Men's
Men's Competition

Women's
Women's Competition

Mountain bike

Men's
Men's Competition

Women's
Women's Competition

Road

Men's
Mass Start
Individual Time Trial

Women's
Mass Start
Individual Time Trial

Track

Men's
Sprint
Team Sprint
Individual Pursuit
Team Pursuit
Madison
Keirin
Points Race

Women's
Sprint
Individual Pursuit
Points Race

Equestrian

Eventing

Mixed
Individual 3-Day Event
Team 3-Day Event

Dressage

Mixed
Individual Dressage
Team Dressage

Show jumping

Mixed
Individual Jumping
Team Jumping

Fencing

Men's
Individual Epee
Individual Foil
Individual Sabre
Team Épée
Team Sabre

Women's
Individual Épée
Individual Foil
Individual Sabre
Team Foil
Team Sabre

Football

Men's
12-Team Event

Women's
10-Team Event

Futsal

Men's
Men's Competition

Gymnastics

Artistic

Men's
Team All-Around
Individual All-Around
Floor
Pommel Horse
Rings
Vault
Parallel Bars
Horizontal Bar

Women's
Team All-Around
Individual All-Around
Vault
Uneven Bars
Balance Beam
Floor

Rhythmic

Women's
Individual All-Around
Group All-Around
Individual Apparatus 1
Individual Apparatus 2
Individual Apparatus 3
Individual Apparatus 4
Group Apparatus 1
Group Apparatus 2

Trampolining

Men's
Individual

Women's
Individual

Handball

Men's
8-Team Event

Women's
8-Team Event

Field hockey

Men's
8-Team Event

Women's
8-Team Event

Judo

Men's
60 kg
66 kg
73 kg
81 kg
90 kg
100 kg
Over 100 kg

Women's
48 kg
52 kg
57 kg
63 kg
70 kg
78 kg
Over 78 kg

Karate

Men's
60 kg
65 kg
70 kg
75 kg
80 kg
Over 80 kg

Women's
53 kg
60 kg
Over 60 kg

Modern pentathlon

Men's
Individual Competition

Women's
Individual Competition

Rowing

Men's
Single Sculls
Pairs
Double Sculls
Fours
Quadruple Sculls
Eights
Double Sculls Lightweight
Fours Lightweight

Women's
Single Sculls
Double Sculls
Quadruple Sculls
Double Sculls Lightweight

Sailing

Men's
Neil Pryde RS:X
Laser

Women's
Neil Pryde RS:X
Laser Radial

Mixed
Sunfish
Snipe
Hobie Cat 16
Lightning
J/24

Shooting

Men's
10 m Air Pistol
25 m Rapid Fire Pistol
50m Pistol
10 m Air Rifle
50m Rifle Three Positions
50m Rifle Prone
Trap
Double Trap
Skeet

Women's
10 m Air Pistol
25m Sport Pistol
10 m Air Rifle
50m Rifle Three Positions
Trap
Skeet

Skating

Speed skating

Men's
Combined Sprint
Combined Distance

Women's
Combined Sprint
Combined Distance

Figure skating

Men's
Individual Competition

Women's
Individual Competition

Softball

Women's
8-Team Event

Squash

Men's
Individual Competition
Team Competition

Women's
Individual Competition
Team Competition

Table tennis

Men's
Individual Competition
Team Competition

Women's
Individual Competition
Team Competition

Taekwondo

Men's
58 kg
68 kg
80 kg
Over 80 kg

Women's
49 kg
57 kg
67 kg
Over 67 kg

Tennis

Men's
Individual Competition
Doubles Competition

Women's
Individual Competition
Doubles Competition

Triathlon

Men's
Individual Competition

Women's
Individual Competition

Volleyball

Men's
8-Team Event

Women's
8-Team Event

Water skiing

Men's
Slalom
Jump
Tricks
Wakeboard

Women's
Slalom
Jump
Tricks

Weightlifting

Men's
56 kg
62 kg
69 kg
77 kg
85 kg
94 kg
105 kg
Over 105 kg

Women's
48 kg
53 kg
58 kg
63 kg
69 kg
75 kg
Over 75 kg

Wrestling

Freestyle

Men's
55 kg
60 kg
66 kg
74 kg
84 kg
96 kg
120 kg

Greco-Roman

Men's
55 kg
60 kg
66 kg
74 kg
84 kg
96 kg
120 kg

Women's

Women's
48 kg
55 kg
63 kg
72 kg

See also